Take the Long Way Home is the eighth studio album by American actor and country music artist John Schneider. It was released in 1985 via MCA Records. The includes the singles "At the Sound of the Tone" and "Take the Long Way Home.

Track listing

Personnel
Adapted from liner notes.

Matt Betton – drums
Larry Byrom – electric guitar, slide guitar
Johnny Cash – additional vocals on "Better Class of Losers"
Emory Gordy Jr. – bass guitar
John Barlow Jarvis – piano, synthesizer
Waylon Jennings – additional vocals on "Better Class of Losers"
Mike Lawler – synthesizer
John Schneider – lead vocals, background vocals
Lisa Silver – fiddle
Billy Joe Walker Jr. – acoustic guitar
Curtis "Mr. Harmony" Young – background vocals
Reggie Young – electric guitar

Chart performance

References

1986 albums
John Schneider (screen actor) albums
Albums produced by Jimmy Bowen
MCA Records albums